Lars Rohwer (born 1 February 1972) is a German politician for the CDU and since 2021 member of the Bundestag, the federal diet.

Life and politics 

Rohwer was born 1972 in the East German city of Dresden and was elected 2021 for the Dresden II – Bautzen II constituency in the Bundestag.

References 

Christian Democratic Union of Germany politicians
Members of the Bundestag 2021–2025
21st-century German politicians

Living people
1972 births

People from Dresden